Sangkar is a 2019 Malaysian Malay-language action drama film. It depicts the rivalry and redemption between two local mixed martial arts (MMA) fighters, as they go from enemies to friends while fighting for glory and family. This film is the first Malaysian MMA film . It stars Zul Ariffin, Remy Ishak, and Mira Filzah. This was the reunion project of Ariffin and Ishak, nine years after Evolusi KL Drift 2 (2010).

It was released on 29 August 2019 in Malaysia, Singapore and Brunei.

Synopsis
The film presents Adam as an MMA fighter, raised by his stepfather Hassan after his mother Hajar died while his father was in prison. Adam was supposed to fight with James McSweeney, but McSweeney's arm was broken due to an accident. He was replaced by Johan. Azalea, (Johan’s sister) who works as the nurse, forces Reza (Johan’s little brother) to go home.

During the tournament, Adam pokes Johan’s eye. Adam wins the tournament playing dirty tactics. Farid, who is the bookie debt collector, is not satisfied that Adam won. Adam tells Farid that he will pay him. Johan was supposed to be home after praying, but a massive fight with police involved Adam and Johan. Soon after, Johan is seriously injured by Adam, while Jai and his friends are arrested by police.

Adam feels guilty that Johan was sent to the hospital. He rushes to see him, but is attacked by Bob (a friend of Johan) and Lea tells Bob to calm him down. She tells Adam to not to see Johan and force him to leave. After that, Adam works as a construction worker. He causes an incident. His boss Hassan tells Adam that he is going to cut his salary and humiliate his mother. Adam quits.

Adam is followed by Reza to the mosque. Adam’s house gets trashed. He sees a cheque on his mother's picture with a note saying, ‘pay or die’. Adam wants Lea to keep the money, but she refuses. Adam goes to sees Johan, who calls the nurse and tells them to get Adam to leave. Later on, Adam was forced to throw away the alcohol and learns about repenting with his late mother.

The next morning, Adam visits Johan again. Johan tells him he is giving the money to his family. Adam is chased by Farid’s henchmen. He fights them but is knocked out and falls off the roof. Adam gives RM1000 to Farid and RM1000 to him. He wants to fight in the underground with prizes RM2000.

Adam is called by Reza that Johan had fallen by his bed. Adam tries to carry Johan, but Johan tells him not to.  He forces Reza to carry him instead. Lea comes home angry at Reza about Adam who came to help. Johan tells Lea that Adam is going to help him. The next morning, Adam, Lee and Hafiz steal a wheelchair and bed at the retirement house. They send the wheelchair and a bed to Johan’s house. Johan doesn’t thank Adam. Adam takes care of Johan helping him eat, drink, and give him adult diapers.

Later than evening, Adam loses a fight in the underground. Hafiz gives him money.  Adam, Johan, Lea, Bob and Reza go to the water park. Adam starts to feel love for Lea, but she is not ready. He takes another fight and wins, but McSweeney tells him that he will join him the fight and not be a coward.

Lea heals Adam after a fight and tells him she doesn't like people who fight. Adam and Johan enjoy the view at the park. After Johan realizes about the night fight, he forgives Adam. Meanwhile, Jai is released from prison and explains to Lea about the night fight. Lea knows that Johan and Adam were fighting. Adam explains to Lea that he is the one who injured Johan. Outraged, Lea angrily slaps Adam, forcing him to leave. Johan tells Lea to give Adam a chance, but she refuses. Adam doesn't forgive himself. Lea feels deeply embarrassed.

After that, Adam is told by Hafiz that Mcsweeney is going to fight with Adam. He rushes to the hospital to see Johan. Adam is not yet training to fight Mcsweeney. Johan trains Adam to fighting with Mcsweeney. Johan stops fighting and becomes as Adam's trainer.

At the final tournament, Adam finally fights Mcsweeney. As Mcsweeney beats on Adam, but he sees his late mother who tells him to try again. In the final round, Adam finally defeats Mcsweeney.

Cast 
 Zul Ariffin as Adam Abdullah
 Mira Filzah as Liya
 Remy Ishak as Johan Kamaruddin
 Nik Adam Mika as Reza
 Ray (Era FM) as Bob
 Niezam Zaidi as Jai
 Aman Graseka as Hassan
 James McSweeney as MMA Athlete
 Andy Teh
 Fadlan Hazim
 Carliff Carleel
 Emelda Rosmila
 Zarul Albakri

Production 
The film cost around RM 2.8 million. Filming took place in Kuala Lumpur, Petaling Jaya and Banting, Selangor from 7 May to 11 June 2018. MMA fighter Saiful Reza choreographed the scenes and trained the actors. The film also features appearances by established MMA fighter such as local fighters Saiful Merican, Peter Davis, Jihin Radzuan, Rashid Salleh, Andy Teh; and international fighters James "Sledgehammer" McSweeney and Davron Kuronboev.

References

External links
 
 Sangkar on Cinema.com.my

Malaysian action films
Malaysian martial arts films
2019 films
2019 action films
2019 martial arts films